Vinda Jeevan Gaurav Puraskar (विंदा करंदीकर जीवन गौरव पुरस्कार ) is a lifetime achievement award conferred annually by the Department of Marathi Language, Government of Maharashtra.It is given to a writer who has made a lasting and valuable contribution to Marathi literature.originally consisted of a citation and a cash award of Rupees Five Lakh (₹ 5,00,000). It is named in honour of Marathi poet Govind Vinayak Karandikar.

Description
The awards now consists of a citation, memento and a cash award of Rupees Five Lakh (₹ 5,00,000).

List of Awardees

References

External links
Vinda Karandikar Jeevan Gaurav Puraskar - Official Website

Awards established in 2010
Indian literary awards